The Curragh Coal Mine is an open-cut, coal mine located 30 km north of Blackwater in Central Queensland, Australia. The mine has coal reserves amounting to 88 million tonnes of coking coal, one of the largest coal reserves in Asia and the world. The mine had an annual production capacity of 7 million tonnes of coal. The mine covers 12,600 ha of the Rangal Coal measures in the Bowen Basin.

In 2012, production at the mine was increased to 8.5 million tonnes a year.  Later in the year operations changed from seven days per week to five.

Curragh Coal Mine was previously owned by Wesfarmers Resources and has an expected mine life to 2025.  Overburden is removed by Thiess.

In 2017, Coronado Coal Group purchased Curragh Coal Mine from Wesfarmers Resources.

Exports from the mine leave the country via the Blackwater railway system and the Port of Gladstone.  Some of the coal is used to produce electricity at the Stanwell Power Station.

Incidents
In January 2020, a 33-year-old worker was killed after being trapped under heavy machinery at the mine. A number of charges relating to the incident were laid by the Office of the Work Health and Safety Prosecutor under the Coal Mining Safety and Health Act 1999. Another worker was fatally injured at the mine in November 2021.

See also

Coal in Australia
List of mines in Australia

References 

≈

Coal mines in Queensland
Mines in Central Queensland
Surface mines in Australia